Finn Wagle (born 19 June 1941) is a theologian and a former bishop of Nidaros in the Church of Norway. He was also the Preses (Primus inter pares, “first among equals”) and thus presided over the Bishop's Conference in the Church of Norway from 2002 until 2006.

Career
Wagle enrolled as a student at MF Norwegian School of Theology in 1962, and graduated in 1968 with the cand.theol. degree. The following year he graduated from the Practical Theological Seminary at MF. He also studied in 1966-1967 in Berlin with a Willy Brandt Scholarship.

Wagle's first post was serving as an army chaplain (1970) before working as a vicar in Sørreisa in the Diocese of Nord-Hålogaland from 1970-1975. From 1975 until 1981, he worked as an assistant professor at the Practical Theological Seminary at MF Norwegian School of Theology, while at the same time working for the Association of Ministers in the Church of Norway. From 1981-1988 he worked as director of the institute Church Educational Center (IKO), and in 1988 he became the Dean of the Nidaros Cathedral.

In 1991, Wagle became the bishop of the Diocese of Nidaros and was succeeded by Tor Singsaas upon his retirement in July 2008.  In 2002, the Bishop's Conference of the Church of Norway elected him to be Preses, a position he held until 2006.  He retired in 2008 due to health reasons.

On 23 June 1991, Wagle was part of the consecration ceremony at the Nidaros Cathedral for the new king, Harald V.  He also led the wedding ceremony at the Nidaros Cathedral for the king's daughter Princess Märtha Louise and Ari Behn on 24 May 2002.

References

1941 births
Living people
Bishops of Nidaros
Primates of the Church of Norway
MF Norwegian School of Theology, Religion and Society alumni
Academic staff of the MF Norwegian School of Theology, Religion and Society
20th-century Lutheran bishops
21st-century Lutheran bishops
Norwegian military chaplains
Norwegian Army chaplains